The Sand Springs Station is a historic site in Churchill County, Nevada that was listed on the National Register of Historic Places in 1980.  A Pony Express station existed there in 1860. The ruins are located within the boundaries of the Sand Mountain Recreation Area.

The station was named for a sand-filled summit from which a spring emanated.

References 

Buildings and structures completed in 1859
National Register of Historic Places in Churchill County, Nevada
Road transportation buildings and structures on the National Register of Historic Places
National Register of Historic Places in Nevada
Pony Express stations
Transportation buildings and structures on the National Register of Historic Places in Nevada